Senator Curtis may refer to:

Members of the United States Senate
Carl Curtis (1905–2000), U.S. Senator from Nebraska from 1955 to 1979
Charles Curtis (1860–1936), U.S. Senator from Kansas from 1907 to 1913 and from 1915 to 1929

United States state senate members
David L. Curtis (born 1947), North Carolina State Senate
Edward C. Curtis (1865–1920), Illinois State Senate
Jack Curtis (politician) (1912–2002), Missouri State Senate
James C. Curtis (1797–1881), New York State Senate
Julius Curtis (1825–1907), Connecticut State Senate
Laurence Curtis (1893–1989), Massachusetts State Senate
Aubyn Curtiss (1925–2017), Montana State Senate
H. W. Curtiss (1824–1902), Ohio State Senate